Stanislav Birner and Blaine Willenborg were the defending champions, but did not participate this year.

Michael Mortensen and Mats Wilander won the title, defeating Libor Pimek and Tomáš Šmíd 6–1, 3–6, 7–5 in the final. The doubles final could not be played due to rain. It was rescheduled to the first day of the 1984 Stockholm Open tournament in late October and was played on the indoor hard courts of the Kungliga tennishallen.

Seeds

  Libor Pimek /  Tomáš Šmíd (final)
  Michael Mortensen /  Mats Wilander (champions)
  Markus Günthardt /  Zoltan Kuharszky (first round)
  Peter Doohan /  Brian Levine (semifinals)

Draw

Draw

References

External links
 Draw

1984 in Swiss sport
1984 Grand Prix (tennis)
1984 Geneva Open